Staré Město or Staré Mesto may refer to:

Places

Czech Republic
Old Town (Prague), historical part of Prague
Staré Město (Uherské Hradiště District), a town in the Zlín Region
Staré Město (Bruntál District), a municipality in the Moravian-Silesian Region
Staré Město (Frýdek-Místek District), a municipality in the Moravian-Silesian Region
Staré Město (Šumperk District), a town in the Olomouc Region
Staré Město (Svitavy District), a municipality in the Pardubice Region
Staré Město (Karviná), an administrative part of Karviná in the Moravian-Silesian Region
Staré Město (Třinec), an administrative part of Třinec in the Moravian-Silesian Region
Staré Město pod Landštejnem, a market town in the Olomouc Region

Slovakia
Old Town, Bratislava, Bratislava
Old Town, Košice, Košice

See also
Old Town (disambiguation)
Stare Miasto (disambiguation)